Area code 231 is a telephone area code in the North American Numbering Plan (NANP) for the northwestern portion of the Lower Peninsula in the U.S. state of Michigan,

History 
Area code 231 was created in June 1999 by an area code split of area code 616, which had served the entire western half of the Lower Peninsula, extending west from the north-south line aligned with the Mackinac Bridge. 231 was carved out of the northern part. It is centered around the western half of the territory generally defined as Northern Michigan. It also includes Muskegon, which is usually counted as part of West Michigan.

Service area
Area code 231 includes (but is not limited to) the following communities:

In addition, 231 also includes Bois Blanc Township, which is part of the Upper Peninsula.  It is the only municipality in the Upper Peninsula that uses 231, while the rest uses 906.

External links
 Planning letter 167, which details 231's creation (PDF)
Map of Michigan area codes at North American Numbering Plan Administration's website
List of exchanges from AreaCodeDownload.com, 231 Area Code

Telecommunications-related introductions in 1999
231
231
West Michigan
Northern Michigan